Friedrich Krebs was a German lawyer and mayor of Frankfurt during Nazi rule. In March 1933, Krebs, a fervent anti-Semite and member of the Nazi Party, ousted the previous mayor, Ludwig Landmann, who was Jewish. Within two weeks Krebs fired all Jewish city employees, even before the German Law for the Restoration of the Professional Civil Service formally removed Jews from government service.

He was a passenger on the Hindenburg on its 1936 maiden voyage from Germany to the United States.

Early life 
Krebs grew up in Alsace and attended schools in Thann, Weißenburg and Strasbourg. After graduating from high school in 1912, he studied law and political science at the Kaiser Wilhelm University of Strasbourg. During his studies, he became a member of the Germania Strasbourg fraternity in 1913. From 1914 to 1918, he participated in the First World War as a war volunteer. After the annexation of Alsace by France, he was expelled from Strasbourg at the end of 1918 and went to Frankfurt, where he passed his state examination in law in 1919. Krebs received his doctorate in 1922 from the University of Giessen and subsequently was a judge on the District Court of Frankfurt from 1923 to 1925. He then served as a member of the German representation at the German-English Arbitration Court in Berlin from 1926 to 1928 and a District Court Councilor in the 4th Civil Chamber of the Higher Regional Court of Frankfurt.

Political career 
Parallel to his legal career, Krebs was involved in the People's Movement from 1922 to 1925. In 1924, he became Frankfurt's local group leader of the National Socialist Freedom Movement, a substitute organization of the then banned Nazi Party (NSDAP). In 1929, he joined the NSDAP (member number 173,763), and entered into the Prussian Landtag as a member of parliament.

Jewish Mayor of Frankfurt Ludwig Landmann was ousted on March 12, 1933 as a result of Adolf Hitler's national seizure of power. New elections were called for the city council and Krebs was appointed acting mayor. On June 13, his appointment was confirmed in an election by the new council. Almost only members of the NSDAP were present at the election; while the members of the SPD and the KPD had a majority together, they were banned under Nazi rule.

On March 28, 1933, Krebs ordered to remove all Jewish employees and officials of the city from office. 81 members of the city administration or the municipal societies were affected. His approach was later formally approved by the Law on the Restoration of the Professional Civil Service in April 1933. The statue of Friedrich Ebert in front of St. Paul's Church was also removed. In 1935, Krebs appointed Frankfurt as The City of German Crafts after Hitler's consent by telegraph. Previously, Kerbs  temporarily chaired the board of the HaFraBa Highway Construction Association and had initially tried several times to give Frankfurt the title of City of Roads. However, the Inspector General for German Road, Fritz Todt, successfully prevented this request.

He was a passenger on the Hindenburg on its 1936 maiden voyage from Germany to the United States.

Krebs, who also worked in the Reich Music Chamber, became head of the Reichsfachschaft Konzertwesen in 1935. In 1937, he joined the SA, in which he became Obersturmbannführer in 1939. In 1941, he was one of the keynote speakers on the occasion of the opening of Alfred Rosenberg's anti-semitic Frankfurt Institute for the Study of the Jewish Question. In 1933, Krebs established the Frankfurter Modeamt to help make Frankfurt a center for women’s fashion in the Third Reich.

After the heavy air raids on Frankfurt on the 18th and 22nd In March 1944, the NSDAP organized a rally under cancer under the motto We never surrender!. On the 28th March 1945, the Second World War ended in Frankfurt and Krebs was eventually replaced as mayor by Wilhelm Hollbach who was appointed by the United States military command.

Life after the Second World War 
Krebs was interned by the American military government in the Darmstadt camp until 1948 after his flight and subsequent arrest. In the court proceedings, it was deemed that he exercised "his office fairly, correctly, cleanly and unaffected by National Socialist tendencies," and thus he was not sanctioned. Decisive for this assessment were the numerous Persilscheine issued by fellow citizens for his discharge. These were related to events during his time as mayor such as his instruction to the fire brigade on November 9, 1938, to extinguish the burning of the West Synagogue in Frankfurt, or his conflicts with the Gauleiter Jakob Sprenger. Krebs is jointly responsible for all measures to 'Nazify'  Frankfurt institutions, including Johann Wolfgang Goethe University and Städtische Bühnen, to enforce Nazi racial policy and to destroy the Jewish community of Frankfurt up to deportation in 1941 and 1942.

He became party chairman and city councilor of the German Party and sought admission as a lawyer from 1950 to 1953, which was refused to him by the Hessian Ministry of Justice, among other things because of an anti-democratic and National Socialist spirit public speech given in 1952. It was not until November 1953, after he had resigned from his mandate as city councilor and left the Germany Party, that he received his admission to the bar and settled as a lawyer. He lost a legal dispute with the city over his pension as mayor from 1956 to 1961; however, the city approved the pensions given by the district court council.

References

Mayors of Frankfurt
Nazi Germany politicians
20th-century German politicians